Master of Romance (stylized as MASTER OF ROMANCE) is the second studio album released by visual kei band Sadie. It was released in two editions, a limited edition with a live DVD and a regular edition. The limited edition features the bonus track "Newage Slicer".

Track listing

Limited Edition

Regular Edition

References

External links
 Discography｜Sadie

2009 albums
Sadie (band) albums